Rhaetian Populars was a political party in Italy based in Sondrio. Eugenio Tarabini has been the leader of the party until his death (in 2018).

History

The party was founded around in 1997 by Eugenio Tarabini (former Undersecretary and MP) and Paolo Arrigoni (former president of the Lombardy Region). The party was founded with the aim of obtaining the Valtellina autonomy and regularly appears in the Sondrio administrative elections.

In 1999 the leader and founder of the party, Eugenio Tarabini, was elected President of the Province of Sondrio with the support of the Pole of Freedoms. In 2004 Tarabini lost re-election against Fiorello Provera, candidate of the Northern League.

In 2003 Bianca Bianchini, member of the Rhaetian Populars, was elected Mayor of Sondrio. 

After the death of Eugenio Tarabini in 2018, Mauro Bianchini took over the leadership of the party.

References

Political parties in Lombardy
Christian democratic parties in Italy
Catholic political parties
1997 establishments in Italy
Political parties established in 1997